Two ships of the United States Navy have been named Ammen for Daniel Ammen.

 , was a Paulding-class destroyer launched in 1910 and served in World War I.
 , was a Fletcher-class destroyer launched in 1942, served in World War II and decommissioned in 1960.

Sources

United States Navy ship names